Fernando Bermúdez (died  978), the second Count of Cea, was the son of Bermudo Núñez and his wife Argilo. As the father of a queen of Navarre, and therefore, ancestor of many royal houses, Fernando was a distinguished member of the highest ranks of the nobility of the Kingdom of León.

Biographical sketch 
The firstborn of count Bermudo Núñez, he inherited many properties from his father and also from his uncle Oveco Núñez, Bishop of León, and appears as Fredenando Vermudiz in a donation made on 28 August 945 by the bishop to the Monastery of Sahagún. The relationship is also confirmed in a charter dated 984 when it mentions that this monastery had acquired a certain property from count Fernando Bermúdez that had previously belonged to the bishop.

He spent his first years in Asturias where he had vast holdings, some of which had been donated by Queen Urraca, the widow of King Fruela II of Asturias, and by the Infantes Ramiro and Ordoño Froilaz, as attested in an inventory of various properties in Naptavlio that were probably given as compensation for his support of King Fruela and for having participated in the rebellion in 932 against King Ramiro II who forced Fernando to return two churches to the Cathedral of Oviedo. His relations with the crown improved during the reign of King Ordoño III. He was the mayordomo mayor of this king, confirmed many of his royal charters as an active member of the curia regis, and appears for the first time in 960 with the title of "Count". His last appearance in medieval charters was in 978.

Marriage and issue 
He married Elvira Díaz, daughter of Diego Muñoz, count of Saldaña, and his wife Tregidia. They were the parents of:
 Pedro Fernández (died ca. 1028), the third Count of Cea and lacking a male heir, the agnate line of the counts of Cea was extinguished. With his wife, Sancha Muñoz, he had only one daughter named Elvira Pérez. 
 Gómez Fernández (died before 978), was the husband of Onecca and father of Countess Onecca Gómez, wife of Count Fortún who was most likely a member of the royal house of Pamplona. He was probably the father of Fernando and Rodrigo Gómez.
 Gotina Fernández, the wife of Count Pelayo Rodríguez.
 Jimena Fernández, Queen consort as the wife of King García Sánchez II and mother of King Sancho III of Navarre. 
 Justa Fernández, the first wife of Count Flaín Muñoz.
 Elvira Fernández.

Notes

References

Bibliography 
 
 

Counts of Spain
10th-century births
970s deaths
Year of birth unknown
Year of death uncertain
10th-century nobility from the Kingdom of León